is a passenger railway station in the city of Toride, Ibaraki Prefecture, Japan operated by the private railway company Kantō Railway.

Lines

Station layout
The station consists of two opposed elevated side platforms, with the station building underneath. The station is unattended.

Platforms

Adjacent stations

History
Nishi-Toride Station was opened on 1 December 1979.

Passenger statistics
In fiscal 2018, the station was used by an average of 2498 passengers daily (boarding passengers only).

Surrounding area
Toride-Shirayama Post Office

See also
 List of railway stations in Japan

References

External links

 Kantō Railway Station Information 

Railway stations in Ibaraki Prefecture
Railway stations in Japan opened in 1979
Toride, Ibaraki